Hoofddorp is a railway station in Hoofddorp, Netherlands located on the Weesp–Leiden railway.

History
From 1912 to 1935 the town had a station also called Hoofddorp nearer to the town centre at the ceased Hoofddorp–Leiden railway (Haarlemmermeerspoorlijn from Aalsmeer to Haarlem, via Hoofddorp and Leiden). The former station building is in use as a residence.

The current station opened on 31 May 1981. The station was rebuilt in 1998 to its current look.

Hoofddorp has a depot/sidings further west from the station, this is the reason many sprinter services have their terminus over here. Intercity services terminating at Schiphol also use this depot before returning. The station consist of 2 double-track platforms and has 6 tracks. Regular bus services stop at street level below the station. ZuidTangent bus rapid transit lines 300 and 310 use the platform level stop next to the station.

Train services

, the following train services call at this station:
2× per hour local Sprinter service Leiden - Schiphol - Amsterdam - Zaandam - Hoorn
2× per hour local Sprinter service Hoofddorp - Schiphol - Amsterdam Zuid - Almere
2× per hour local Sprinter service The Hague - Leiden - Schiphol - Amsterdam CS - Almere - Lelystad - Zwolle
2× per hour local Sprinter service Hoofddorp - Schiphol - Amsterdam CS - Hilversum - Amersfoort
2x per hour local "Sprinter" service
Hoofddorp - Schiphol - Amsterdam Zuid - Naarden-Bussum - Hilversum - Utrecht Centraal

Bus services
The following bus services call at Station Hoofddorp. Buses depart from the bus stops at street level below the station. Lines 300 and 397 depart at the viaduct next to the station. All buses are operated by Connexxion.

External links

NS website 
Dutch Public Transport journey planner 

Railway stations in North Holland
Railway stations opened in 1912
Railway stations closed in 1935
Railway stations opened in 1981
1912 establishments in the Netherlands
Railway stations in the Netherlands opened in the 20th century